Christos Arvanitis (born 23 January 1957) is a Greek former professional footballer who played as a goalkeeper.

Club career
Arvanitis started his football career playing for the youth departments of Ethnikos Piraeus. He was then promoted to the first team of Ethnikos where he had a very good presence from 1971 to 1978, when it was time to transfer to Olympiacos. In the "red and whites" after spending a year on the bench, he replaced Kelesidis in the starting eleven and with his performances greatly helped Olympiacos to win the championship in 1980. Later, however, he was displaced from the eleven by the then rising star of Greek football, Nikos Sarganis, as a result of which he looked for a new football club in his career. In his 4-year spell he won 3 convective championships, from 1980 to 1982 and a Cup including a domestic double in 1981. In the summer of 1982, the then President of AEK Athens, Michalis Arkadis brought him to the team and Zlatko Čajkovski immediately gave him a starting shirt. He won the Cup in 1983 with AEK, having a very big contribution to the title, as he was one of the best in the match. He stayed at AEK until December 1985, when he left having already started to lose his place in the main squad to Theologis Papadopoulos. A goalkeeper with great reflexes and an amazing jump, but also unstable at times, he was nevertheless a goalkeeper with a positive presence in AEK, but also in the Greek league in general. After AEK he returned to Olympiacos until 1987, where he won yet another league and then played successfully in Levadiakos where he ended his career in 1989.

International career
Arvanitis competed once with Greece, on 11 January 1978 in an away friendly win against Cyprus by 0–2. he was an international player both with Greece U21 and with the Olympic team, playing twice in 1983.

After football
After the end of his career Arvanitis was a goalkeeping coach in all the teams he had played for. At Olympiacos, Levadiakos, Ethnikos, but also in AEK for some months of the 2012–13 season. Since October 2015, he worked at the football academy of the amateur AEK. In 2017 he worked as the technical director of the Nestoras FC, academy of the legendary Kostas Nestoridis.

Honours

Olympiacos
Alpha Ethniki: 1979–80, 1980–81, 1981–82, 1986–87
Greek Cup: 1980–81

AEK Athens
Greek Cup: 1982–83

References

Greek footballers
Living people
Association football goalkeepers
1957 births
Greece international footballers
Super League Greece players
Ethnikos Piraeus F.C. players
Olympiacos F.C. players
AEK Athens F.C. players
Levadiakos F.C. players
Footballers from Edessa, Greece